Tyler High School, formerly known as John Tyler High School, is a public, co-educational secondary school in Tyler, Texas. It is part of the Tyler Independent School District and serves 9th through 12th grade. In 2020, the  Tyler I. S. D. school board voted to change the name of the High School from John Tyler High (named after the 10th President of the United States), to Tyler High.

About 
Tyler High School, a part of Tyler Independent School District, is located in the northwest section of Tyler, Texas. As of the 2019-20 academic year, the school boasted an enrollment of approximately 2,110 students. Tyler offers academic avenues through the AP program, UIL competitions, and the College and Career Center. Tyler also carries a long history of athletic excellence in sports such as football, basketball, volleyball, and soccer.

Tyler High School shares a long-standing crosstown rivalry in sports with Tyler Legacy High School, formerly Robert E. Lee High School, located in south Tyler. Although both schools are in different classifications, they meet each year in a non-district game.

Demographics 
As of the 2020-2021 school year, the student population consisted of:

63.2% Hispanic
33.1% African American
2.5% White (Non-Hispanic)
1.0% Two or more races
0.3% American Indian
0% Asian/Pacific Islander

Athletics 
Tyler High is known for its elite football program. The Tyler Lions have won three state championships: first in 1930 under coach George Foltz, when the school was known as "Tyler High," its original name, then in 1973 under coach Corky Nelson and 1994 under coach Allen Wilson, when the school was known as "John Tyler High."

The 1994 championship season featured the noteworthy 1994 John Tyler vs. Plano East high school football game, which ultimately won ESPN's 1995 Showstopper of the Year ESPY Award. In the regional final against Plano East (played at Texas Stadium), John Tyler had a 41–17 lead with 2:42 remaining. Plano East scored a touchdown, then recovered three consecutive onside kicks and scored touchdowns on each of them to take a 44–41 lead with 24 seconds remaining. However, on the ensuing kickoff, John Tyler returner Roderick Dunn ran for a touchdown to win the game 48–44.

Notable alumni 
 Gary Baxter, former NFL player
 Tyus Bowser, NFL player
 Earl Campbell, 1977 Heisman Trophy winner and former NFL Pro Bowl player
 Chris Carter, former NFL player
 Ricky Collins, current CFL wide receiver for the Saskatchewan Roughriders
 James Kenneth Crone, Texas Highway Patrol officer dramatized in the 1974 movie The Sugarland Express
 Tim Crowder, former NFL player
 Don Flynn, former AFL player with the New York Titans, Dallas Texans and CFL with the Edmonton Eskimos; All-American at University of Houston.
 Aqua Franklin, Texas A&M women's basketball 2004–2008, WNBA drafted 38th pick Sacramento Monarchs, assistant coach at Stephen F. Austin 2010–2011, University of Kansas 2011–2012, Mississippi State University. Currently, she is the associate head coach with University of Kansas.
 Keith Guthrie, former NFL player
 Daniel Hernandez, former MLS soccer player
 Rakim Hollis, basketball for TSU and European League
 Jeremy Johnson former all-state quarterback, SMU wide receiver, holds the record for most receptions in a single season. Former NFL player with the Cincinnati Bengals.
 Kendall Hunter, NFL player, running back with the San Francisco 49ers
 Gary Jones, former NFL player 
 Jeremy Lane, NFL player, cornerback with the Seattle Seahawks
 Archie Reynolds, former MLB player
 Aaron Ross, 2006 Jim Thorpe Award winner and NFL player with the New York Giants
 Hazel Shaw, actress and model
 Quincy Stewart, former NFL player and a member of the Edmonton Eskimos team of the CFL that won the Grey Cup in 2005
 Greg Ward Jr., NFL player
 Teddy Williams, four-time NCAA track and fieldAll-American at the University of Texas at San Antonio; NFL player

Notable events
On September 23, 2009, a 16-year-old student stabbed 52-year-old music therapist Todd Henry.
On February 14, 1981, fire destroyed nearly 90 percent of John Tyler High School's campus.

References

https://tylerpaper.com/news/education/john-tyler-changes-their-name/article_23f46858-d803-11ea-a4bb-73674091c75b.html

External links

 John Tyler Lions Alumni homepage
 John Tyler Lions football homepage

Schools in Smith County, Texas
High schools in Tyler, Texas
Public high schools in Texas